Bafaw-Balong is a Bantu language of Cameroon. There are two divergent varieties, Fo’ (Bafaw, Bafo, Bafowu, Afo, Nho, Lefo’) and Long (Balong, Balon, Balung, Nlong, Valongi, Bayi, Bai), which are sometimes considered distinct languages.

The Bafaw and Balong people are two of several who call themselves Ngoe as they share a legendary origin with speakers of the Ngoe languages, but their language is not part of that group.

References

Sawabantu languages
Languages of Cameroon